The Stranger Left No Card is a 1952 British short film directed by Wendy Toye. The film won the Best Fiction award at the 1953 Cannes Film Festival, where it was described as "a masterpiece" by Jean Cocteau. It marked the film debut of actor Alan Badel.

Plot
Alan Badel plays the stranger, who arrives in a small town, costumed as a flamboyant itinerant magician with a folding bag of tricks. After a week in town, where the outrageous behaviour of 'Napoleon' soon gives him a reputation for harmless, flamboyant buffoonery, he visits a businessman. The businessman is known to keep regular hours and the stranger bedevils him with irritating magic tricks. The last of these tricks leaves the man handcuffed in his office.

Slowly, speaking all the while, Napoleon's monologue grows slower and sadder. It turns out he's been in costume for a week to confuse witnesses: he removes the lifts from his shoes, to reveal his actual short height, false beard, eyebrows and wig, to show his face. The businessman framed this man 15 years ago, for a crime he didn't commit. The magician then stabs the crooked businessman through the heart, and leaves unnoticed.

Cast
Alan Badel - The Stranger
Cameron Hall - Mr. Latham
Geoffrey Bayldon - Clerk
Eileen Way - Secretary

Notes
Incidental music was provided by Doreen Carwithen, though the soundtrack is most remembered for the incessant repetition of Hugo Alfvén's Swedish Rhapsody No. 1 (1903).

The story, by Sidney Carroll, was later remade as Stranger In Town — an episode of the television series Tales of the Unexpected (also directed by Toye) — starring Derek Jacobi and Clive Swift.

"Here Today ... " in Black Cat Mystery #50, June 1954, is an uncredited comic book adaptation with art by Sid Check and Frank Frazetta.

Critical reception
Britmovie wrote, "Toye delightfully handles the ever darkening story from its almost madcap beginning to the sinister finale."

References

External links

1952 films
British short films
British black-and-white films
Films directed by Wendy Toye
1950s English-language films